The 2017 UNAF U-15 Tournament was the first edition of the UNAF U-15 Tournament. The tournament took place in Morocco from 20 to 24 August 2017.

Participants

Venues
Sports Center of FAR, Salé

Tournament

Statistics

Goalscorers
2 goals

 Ashraf Al-Masrati
 Anas Ali Al-Shabli
 Haitam Abaida
 Hamdi Abidi
 Mohamed Amine Ghabi

1 goal

 Zakaria Boucida
 Ziad Bouras
 Wael Rahmouni
 Al-Muntasir Billah Ali
 Maab Mohamed
 Ahmed El-Khiat
 Ayman Hamdy

Awards
Fair play team

Notes & References

Notes

References

External links
 الاجتماع الفني لدورة اتحاد شمال افريقيا لمواليد 2002 وبرنامج المباريات - UNAF official website

2017 in African football
2017
2017